Dinwoodie or Dinwoody may refer to:

People
 David Dinwoodie (born 1965), American anthropologist
 Hubert Dinwoodie (1896–1968), Royal Air Force officer
 James Dinwiddie (astronomer) (1746 - 1815), Scottish natural philosopher
 Tom Dinwoodie (born 1954), entrepreneur and inventor

Other uses
 Dinwoodie railway station, former railway station near Lockerbie, Scotland
 Dinwoody Glacier, located in the Shoshone National Forest, Wyoming
 Henry Dinwoody House, late Victorian house located in Salt Lake City, Utah
 Dinwoody Formation, geologic formation in Montana

See also
 Leofric Hay-Dinwoody (fl. 1925–1932), Anglican priest
 Dunwoody (disambiguation)
 Dinwiddie (disambiguation)